SITVA (Sistema Integrado de Transporte del Valle de Aburrá in Spanish or Aburrá Valley Integrated Transport System) is the public transportation system of Medellín and its metropolitan area. It allows people from the Metropolitan Area of Medellín to move across the ten Aburrá Valley municipalities using different transport modes. It uses integrated fares and a single payment card (Cívica card).

Components 

There is also a tram line: Line T (Ayacucho Tram).

Additionally, the aerial cable car system, Metrocable, which supplements the metro system, comprises six lines: Line J with 3 stations (plus one transfer station with Metro Line B), Line K with 3 stations (plus one transfer station with Metro Line A and one with Line L), Line L with one station (plus one transfer station with Line K), Line H with two stations (plus one transfer station with Line T), Line M with two stations (plus one transfer station with Line T) and Line P with 3 stations (plus one transfer station with Metro Line A). SITVA also integrates a bus rapid transit system (Metroplús), a minibus network called Sistema Integrado de Transporte (SIT) in Spanish and a bicycle-sharing system (EnCicla).

As of 2022, there are 27 metro stations, 15 Metrocable stations, 3 tramway stations (+ 6 tram stops), 20 BRT stations (+ 42 feeding bus stops) in the SITVA network, all listed in the following table; for a total of 65 stations and 48 stops. Transfer stations are in bold, and the transfer station between metro lines A and B is shown in bold-italic:

Expansions

Metrocable 

On 7 August 2004, the city inaugurated a new line known as "Metro Cable" (Line K). The line starts in the Acevedo Station and goes to the up hill district of Santo Domingo Savio. This important addition integrated new additions to the city that since the 1960s that previously were not considered part of the "real city".

On 3 March 2008, a second "Metro Cable" line (Line J) was inaugurated. The line starts in the San Javier Station and goes through Juan XXIII and Vallejuelos to the La Aurora district. This new line benefits approximately 150,000 new users.

A new Metrocable line (line L) was inaugurated in 2009 with a transfer station at Santo Domingo Savio Station. This line continues further uphill to El Tambo in Arví park near Guarne. The reason for constructing this line is because the city wants to promote tourism in the rural area near Lake Guarne. It takes 14 minutes to ascend to El Tambo and there are no intermediate stations.

Line A extension 
Line A was expanded from Itagüí to La Estrella, in the south of the metropolitan area. A new intermediate station, Sabaneta, built near 67th South Street, was opened on 5 August 2012  and the final station, La Estrella, was built near 77th South Street and opened on 17 September 2012.

Train line

In February 2020 it was announced that Medellín will reactivate the train line between Bello and Caldas.

References 

Public transport operators
Public transport in Colombia
Passenger rail transport in Colombia